Rosie Motene is a South African actress, author, film producer and activist. She is a Pan African queer and feminist and speaker on GBV and LGBTQI in Africa. She is the author of the 161-paged book, Reclaiming the Soil: A Black Girl's Struggle to Find Her African Self. She is a Pan-African media proprietor and was one of the as the jurors at the fifth edition of Mashariki African Film Festival (MAFF) in 2019. ZAlebs mentioned her as one of the most prevalent cast members of the Urban Brew Studios.

Career
In 2004, she played the role of a "Receptionist" in Terry George's historical drama, Hotel Rwanda.

She appeared in one of the episodes of the drama television series created by Ashley Pharoah entitled, Wild at Heart (2006–2013), in 2007 where she played the role of "Kenyetta".

In John Kani's 2008 comedy drama film, Nothing But the Truth, she played the role of "Mandisa".

She was one of the producers of the 2011 drama film directed by Akin Omotoso entitled, Man on Ground.

She was one of the participants in the Gender-based violence (GBV) webinar session organized by the Vodacom Foundation on 25 August 2020, aimed at enlightening the public on the harmful effects of GBV and the way forward.

Filmography

Films

Television series

References

External links
 Rosie Motene on IMDb
 Rosie Motene on BrainFarm

Living people
South African actresses
South African writers
South African film producers
South African activists
Year of birth missing (living people)